The 1995 Citizen Cup was a women's tennis tournament played on outdoor clay courts at the Am Rothenbaum in Hamburg, Germany that was part of Tier II of the 1995 WTA Tour. It was the 11th edition of the tournament and was held from 1 May through 7 May 1995. Second-seeded Conchita Martínez won the singles title.

Finals

Singles

 Conchita Martínez defeated  Martina Hingis 6–1, 6–0
 It was Martínez's 3rd title of the year and the 27th of her career.

Doubles

 Gigi Fernández /  Martina Hingis defeated  Conchita Martínez /  Patricia Tarabini 6–2, 6–3
 It was Fernández's 2nd title of the year and the 57th of her career. It was Hingis' only title of the year and the 1st of her career.

External links
 ITF tournament edition details
 Tournament draws

Citizen Cup
WTA Hamburg
1995 in German women's sport
1995 in German tennis